William Leeds may refer to:
 William B. Leeds, American businessman
 William Henry Leeds, English architectural critic and journalist
 Billy Leeds, Australian rules footballer